Antônio Eduardo Pereira dos Santos (born 3 May 1984), commonly known as Kanu, is a Brazilian footballer who plays as a centre-back for Jacuipense.

Career
Kanu joined Beira-Mar in the summer of 2008 from Águia Negra. His time with Auri-negros saw him feature regularly in a side which in the 2009–10 season claimed the Segunda Liga, thus gaining promotion to the Portuguese top flight. Kanu scored the goal which sealed promotion to the top flight against Carregado.

In January 2011, Kanu would leave Beira-Mar for Belgian side Standard Liège on an undisclosed fee. In the summer of 2013, he attracted interest from Anderlecht and Sporting CP, but decided to stay with Standard Liège.

After his release from Liège in the summer of 2014, Kanu signed for Primeira Liga side Vitória de Guimarães.

On 29 December 2015, Belgian Pro League team Oud-Heverlee Leuven announced the signing of Kanu for two and a half years as he was brought in to help the team avoid relegation, however only three months later as the team had suffered relegation his contract was deemed to be too much of a burden for the second division and he was subsequently released. In his short period back in Belgium, Kanu appeared 7 times, scoring one goal against Lokeren.

Honours

Club
Beira-Mar
 Segunda Liga: 2009–10

Standard Liège
Belgian Cup: 2010–11

Vitória
 Campeonato Baiano: 2017

Individual
 Beira-Mar Player of the Year: 2010

References

External links
 

1984 births
Living people
Sportspeople from Salvador, Bahia
Brazilian footballers
Association football defenders
Associação Desportiva Cabofriense players
Campeonato Brasileiro Série A players
Campeonato Brasileiro Série B players
Campeonato Brasileiro Série C players
Ituano FC players
ABC Futebol Clube players
Primeira Liga players
Liga Portugal 2 players
S.C. Beira-Mar players
Kanu
Kanu
Vitória S.C. players
Esporte Clube Vitória players
Oeste Futebol Clube players
Sociedade Desportiva Juazeirense players
Esporte Clube Jacuipense players
Sampaio Corrêa Futebol Clube players
Kanu
Expatriate footballers in Portugal
Brazilian expatriate sportspeople in Portugal
Kanu
Brazilian expatriate footballers